Eric Arnesen (born 30 April 1958) is an American historian. 
He is currently the James R. Hoffa Professor of Modern American Labor History at George Washington University. He was a Fulbright Scholar,
and is a member of the Organization of American Historians.

Life 
Arnesen completed his BA degree from Wesleyan University in 1980. He completed his MA in Afro-American Studies from Yale University in 1984. He received his Ph.D in History from Yale University in 1986.

Bibliography 
 " 'Like Banquo's Ghost, It Will Not Down': The Race Question and the American Railroad Brotherhoods, 1880-1920." American Historical Review 99.5 (1994): 1601–1633. online

 Waterfront Workers of New Orleans: Race, Class, and Politics, 1863–1923. Urbana: University of Illinois Press, 1994. ,  online
 co-editor, Labor Histories: Class, Politics, and the Working-Class Experience (1998) excerpt

 "Whiteness and the historians' imagination." International Labor and Working-Class History 60 (2001): 3–32. online

 Brotherhoods of Color: Black Railroad Workers and the Struggle for Equality. London: Harvard University Press, 2002. ,  online
 . "Specter of the Black Strikebreaker: Race, Employment, and Labor Activism in the Industrial Era." Labor History 44.3 (2003): 319–335. online

 Black Protest and the Great Migration: A Brief History with Documents. Boston; New York: Bedford/St. Martin's, 2003. ,  online

 The Human Tradition in American Labor History. Wilmington, Del.: SR Books, 2004. , 
 editor, Encyclopedia of US Labor and Working-Class History. London: Routledge, 2006. 
 The Black Worker: Race, Labor, and Civil Rights Since Emancipation Urbana: University of Illinois Press, 2007. , 

 "Reconsidering the" Long Civil Rights Movement". Historically Speaking 10.2 (2009): 31–34. online
 "Civil rights and the cold war at home: postwar activism, anticommunism, and the decline of the left." American Communist History 11.1 (2012): 5–44. online
 "The Final Conflict? On the Scholarship of Civil Rights, the Left and the Cold War." American Communist History 11.1 (2012): 63–80. online

References

External links
 
 Eric Arnesen, Bio at Wilson Center
 Eric Arnesen, Biography at Organization of American Historians
 
 

Living people
1958 births
Labor historians
Wesleyan University alumni
Yale Graduate School of Arts and Sciences alumni
George Washington University faculty
21st-century American historians
21st-century American male writers
Columbian College of Arts and Sciences faculty
Columbian College of Arts and Sciences
American male non-fiction writers